Islandale is an unincorporated community in San Juan County, in the U.S. state of Washington.

History
A post office called Islandale was established in 1910, and remained in operation until 1917. The community was named for its location on Lopez Island.

References

Unincorporated communities in San Juan County, Washington
Unincorporated communities in Washington (state)